Louis Bernard Strebler (February 2, 1881 – December 31, 1962) was an American wrestler who competed in the 1904 Summer Olympics. In 1904, he won a bronze medal in bantamweight category and lost to Theodore McLear in the quarterfinals of featherweight category.  His name is sometimes given as Z. B. Strebler, due to a typographical error.

References

External links
profile

1881 births
1962 deaths
Wrestlers at the 1904 Summer Olympics
American male sport wrestlers
Olympic bronze medalists for the United States in wrestling
Medalists at the 1904 Summer Olympics